Derrick Moss may refer to:

Derrick Moss, musician in The Soul Rebels
Derrick Moss, character in Dark Matter (TV series)
Derrick Moss (indoor football) in 2013 Dayton Sharks season